Pike County Airport may refer to:

 Pike County Airport (Kentucky) in Pikeville, Kentucky, United States (FAA: PBX)
 Pike County Airport (Ohio) in Waverly, Ohio, United States (FAA: EOP)
 McComb-Pike County Airport (John E. Lewis Field) in McComb, Mississippi, United States (FAA: MCB)